This is a list of the National Register of Historic Places listings in Sequoia and Kings Canyon National Parks.

This is intended to be a complete list of the properties and districts on the National Register of Historic Places in Sequoia National Park and Kings Canyon National Park, California, United States.  The locations of National Register properties and districts for which the latitude and longitude coordinates are included below, may be seen in a Google map.

There are 23 properties and districts listed on the National Register in the park.

Current listings 

|}

See also 
 National Register of Historic Places listings in Fresno County, California
 National Register of Historic Places listings in Tulare County, California
 National Register of Historic Places listings in California

References 

Sequoia-Kings Canyon National Parks